Forbes KB (born Duncan Forbes Valentine Keir on 29 May 1965) is a Scottish actor. He appeared in more than seventy films since 2003.

Selected filmography

References

External links 

1965 births
Living people
Scottish male film actors